Brookhouse Colliery was a coal mine within the Metropolitan Borough of Rotherham, South Yorkshire, England. It was operational between 1929 and 1985.
 
To develop coal seams in the area, the Sheffield Coal Company opened a new colliery between Swallownest and Beighton, at that time on the borders of Rotherham Rural District and Derbyshire but now just within the borough of  Rotherham. The company, which became part of the United Steel Companies in 1937, already owned other collieries in the area, particularly the Birley Collieries and that at Aston Common, known as North Staveley Colliery.

Brookhouse was not opened until 1929 and linked with its neighbours underground. The site also included coke ovens and by-products plants supplying metallurgical coke to the iron and steel industry, particularly those in Scunthorpe.

The colliery passed to the National Coal Board on nationalisation in 1947 and was closed in 1985.

After closure the site became part of a long-held plan by Rotherham Borough Council, Sheffield City Council and North East Derbyshire District Council to create the northern extension to the Rother Valley Country Park. The first part of the plan, the southern part of which was commenced in 1976, was to extract coal by opencasting from the area before commencement of landscaping.

References 
East of Sheffield by Roger Milnes. "Forward" - The journal of the Great Central Railway Society, No.16, July 1984.  (This article also uses unpublished material researched for "East of Sheffield" from various sources including members of the Kiveton and Wales Local History Group).
Official Company Handbook of the United Steel Companies.

Coal mines in Rotherham
Coal mines in South Yorkshire
Underground mines in England